Cariua sulphurea is a species of beetle in the family Cerambycidae, and the only species in the genus Cariua. It was described by Martins and Galileo in 2008.

References

Hemilophini
Beetles described in 2008